Tampines Meridian Junior College (TMJC) is a junior college in Singapore, founded in 2018, offering two-year pre-university courses leading up to the Singapore-Cambridge GCE Advanced Level examination. It was founded after the merger of Tampines Junior College and Meridian Junior College, which was prompted by a decrease in student enrolment.

History

In 2017, Singapore's Ministry of Education (MOE) announced a merging exercise of various schools in view of the declining birth rate in Singapore. Enrolments were predicted to fall to as low as 200 to 300 students at some junior colleges within a few years. Also included in this exercise were seven pairs of primary schools and three pairs of secondary schools. Tampines Junior College (founded 1986) and Meridian Junior College (founded 2003) were among the eight junior colleges selected for the merging exercise.

The new names of the four new junior colleges were formally made known in January 2018. They adopted a combination of the full names of both colleges, with the name of the older college coming first. The college thus received the name Tampines Meridian Junior College (TMJC), with its campus taking over the facilities at the Meridian Junior College campus.

TMJC started work on the merger in 2018, and formally started operations on 7 January 2019, with the lowering of the flags of its predecessors and the raising of the TMJC flag. Bonding activities for students and teachers were conducted the same day.

The college anthem, which was composed by Tampines Junior College alumni Joel Nah, was composed over the course of 2019 and presented to the students and staff on two occasions towards the end of the academic year.

Since January 2021, TMJC held its first virtual open house in place of a regular one due to the COVID-19 pandemic.

Principals
The first principal of TMJC, Ms Pamela Yoong, was also the sixth and final principal of TPJC prior to the merger.

Identity
Students of TMJC are usually referred to as "TMJCians" or "Tampines Meridians".

Crest
The circular shape represents TMJC's commitment to provide an all-rounded, holistic and rich education. Red represents courage, resilience and care, while silver represents integrity. The bold letters spelling the college’s initials represent the college’s clarity of purpose and steadfast determination to always strive to be better.

Uniform
The uniform was selected from four proposed colour schemes, with a neutral design of white and khaki being selected.

House System
During internal sports competitions in the college, the college's sports houses would be ranked against each other, with prizes for the top house. The house crests were unveiled on 12 July 2019 as part of a college celebratory event. The five houses of TMJC are as follows:
 Aquila (Red, Eagle)
 Corvus (Blue, Raven)
Cygnus (White, Swan)
 Draco (Grey, Dragon)
Pavo (Pink, Peacock)

Campus
TMJC's campus is located at the former MJC campus at Pasir Ris Street 71, retaining the original colour scheme of white, blue and orange. 

TMJC's field and running track are open for public use on weekends. TMJC's canteen, which also serves as a multi-purpose hall, is the only air-conditioned junior college canteen in Singapore.

Outside the lecture theatres is a heritage gallery opened in 2018 to commemorate the histories of TPJC and MJC in light of the merger.

Under the JC Rejuvenation Programme as planned by the MOE, TMJC's campus would be upgraded in its second phase, most likely by 2030.

Academic Information
The list of content-based subjects offered by TMJC for the GCE A-Levels is as follows:

Students applying to take Arts, Further Mathematics and Theatre Studies and Drama must sit for a diagnostic assessment to assess their suitability to take the respective subject.

Each student usually takes three H2 subjects along with one H1 subject. General Paper, Project Work and Mother Tongue are compulsory H1 subjects for all students, although Project Work and Mother Tongue would only be examined at the end of JC1. Students can be exempted from H1 Mother Tongue if they have:

 Obtained a D7 or better for the relevant Higher Mother Tongue at the O-Levels
 Chosen to take any of the Mother Tongue Language and Literature subjects, i.e CLL, MLL and TLL
 Been exempted from Mother Tongue by MOE

Students with a raw L1R5 of 11 and below are eligible to take 4 H2 subjects.

Malay Language Elective Programme (MLEP)
TMJC is one of five junior colleges offering the MLEP. It is for students who show a high level of proficiency and interest in the Malay language, and also aims to enhance these students' understandings of Malay literature and culture. All students who enrol in this programme in TMJC are required to take H2 MLL at the A-Levels.

Theatre Studies and Drama Elective Programme
TMJC offers the Theatre Studies and Drama Elective Programme, which was originally offered in TPJC from 2007 to before the merger. It aims to develop students’ knowledge and understanding of, and critical thinking about, theatre and drama in a variety of historical and cultural contexts; as well as to foster students’ interest and enjoyment in theatre and drama both as participants and as informed members of an audience. All students who enrol in this programme in TMJC are required to take H2 TSD at the A-Levels.

Co-Curricular Activities
A total of 30 CCAs including Students' Council are offered in TMJC. Students normally take part in one CCA. The list of CCAs offered at TMJC is as follows:

References

2019 establishments in Singapore
Educational institutions established in 2019
Junior colleges in Singapore